Warsaw Municipal Airport  is a city-owned public-use airport located six miles (10 km) north of the central business district of Warsaw, a city in Benton County, Missouri, United States.

Although most U.S. airports use the same three-letter location identifier for the FAA and IATA, Warsaw Municipal Airport is assigned RAW by the FAA but has no designation from the IATA (which assigned RAW to Arawa, Papua New Guinea).

Facilities and aircraft 
For the 12-month period ending December 31, 2014, the airport had 3,320 aircraft operations, an average of 9 per day: 96% general aviation, 3% military and 1% air taxi. In January 2018, there were 13 aircraft based at this airport: all 13 single-engine.

References

External links 

Airports in Missouri
Buildings and structures in Benton County, Missouri